Tororris Jermal "T. J." Hill (born July 2, 1980) is an American former Canadian football linebacker. Hill recently played for the Ottawa Redblacks of the Canadian Football League. He was signed by the Kansas City Chiefs as an undrafted free agent in 2002. He played college football at Northeastern.

Hill has also played for the Las Vegas Gladiators, New York Giants, Montreal Alouettes, and Edmonton Eskimos.

References

External links
Ottawa Redblacks bio

1980 births
Living people
American players of Canadian football
American football linebackers
Canadian football linebackers
Edmonton Elks players
Kansas City Chiefs players
Las Vegas Gladiators players
Montreal Alouettes players
New York Giants players
Northeastern Huskies football players
Ottawa Redblacks players
Sportspeople from Paterson, New Jersey